Jefferson Township, Ohio, may refer to:

Jefferson Township, Adams County, Ohio
Jefferson Township, Ashtabula County, Ohio
Jefferson Township, Brown County, Ohio
Jefferson Township, Clinton County, Ohio
Jefferson Township, Coshocton County, Ohio
Jefferson Township, Crawford County, Ohio
Jefferson Township, Fayette County, Ohio
Jefferson Township, Franklin County, Ohio
Jefferson Township, Greene County, Ohio
Jefferson Township, Guernsey County, Ohio
Jefferson Township, Jackson County, Ohio
Jefferson Township, Knox County, Ohio
Jefferson Township, Logan County, Ohio
Jefferson Township, Madison County, Ohio
Jefferson Township, Mercer County, Ohio
Jefferson Township, Montgomery County, Ohio
Jefferson Township, Muskingum County, Ohio
Jefferson Township, Noble County, Ohio
Jefferson Township, Preble County, Ohio
Jefferson Township, Richland County, Ohio
Jefferson Township, Ross County, Ohio
Jefferson Township, Scioto County, Ohio
Jefferson Township, Tuscarawas County, Ohio
Jefferson Township, Williams County, Ohio

Ohio township disambiguation pages